The Captain's Daughter is a 1947 Italian adventure film directed by Mario Camerini. It was entered into the 1947 Cannes Film Festival. It is based on the 1836 novel of the same name by Alexander Pushkin, which is set in Russia during the reign of Catherine II. It takes place during the Cossack Rebellion.

Cast
 Irasema Dilián as Maria Ivanovna "Masha" Mironova
 Amedeo Nazzari as Yemelyan Pugachev, false tsar Peter III
 Vittorio Gassman as Alexey Ivanovich Shvabrin
 Cesare Danova as Pyotr Andreyevich Grinyov
 Aldo Silvani as capitain Ivan Kuzmich Mironov, father of Masha
 Ave Ninchi as Vasilisa Yegorovna Mironova, mother of Masha
 Ernesto Almirante as Savelyich, servant of Grinyov
 Olga Solbelli as Catherine II
 Carlo Ninchi as Zurin
 Laura Gore as Palashka
 Gualtiero Tumiati as Andrey Petrovich Grinev, father of Pyotr

References

External links

1947 films
1940s historical adventure films
1940s Italian-language films
Italian historical adventure films
Italian black-and-white films
Films directed by Mario Camerini
Films set in the Russian Empire
Films based on works by Aleksandr Pushkin
Films set in the 18th century
Cultural depictions of Catherine the Great
The Captain's Daughter
Films about rebellions
1940s Italian films